Rafael Alexandre da Conceição Leão (born 10 June 1999) is a Portuguese professional footballer who plays as a forward for Serie A club AC Milan and the Portugal national team. A skillful and technically gifted player, he is widely regarded as one of the best wingers in the world.

Graduating from Sporting CP youth system, Leão made his first-team debut in 2018, winning the 2017–18 Taça da Liga, before unilaterally terminating his contract, following an incident within the club. Shortly after, he joined for Ligue 1 side Lille on a free transfer. AC Milan signed him in 2019 for a reported fee of €35 million. In his third season at the club, he helped the team win the 2021–22 Serie A, which ended the club's 11-year league title drought. He was also voted Serie A Most Valuable Player and was listed among the 30-man shortlist for the Ballon d'Or.

Leão is a former Portugal youth international, representing his country at various youth levels, being part of the under-17 team that won the 2016 European Championship. He made his senior international debut in 2021.

Club career

Sporting CP
Born in Almada, Setúbal District, to Angolan parents, Leão joined Sporting CP's youth system at the age of 9 after a brief spell in Amora. On 21 May 2017, still a junior, he made his senior debut with the reserves, coming on as a second-half substitute and scoring in a 1–1 away draw against Braga B.

Courtesy of manager Jorge Jesus, Leão first appeared in the Primeira Liga with the first team on 11 February 2018, replacing Bryan Ruiz for the last 21 minutes of the 2–0 home win over Feirense. On 2 March, having taken the place of injured Seydou Doumbia late into the first half, he equalised for the visitors a few minutes after taking the pitch but in a 2–1 away loss to Porto– in the process, he became the club's youngest-ever scorer against that opposition.

On 14 June 2018, Leão unilaterally terminated his contract with the Leões, citing an incident where players and staff had been attacked by fans during training.

Lille

On 8 August 2018, Leão joined French club Lille on a free transfer, signing a five-year deal. Sporting CP would later dispute Lille's deal to sign the player, deeming the transfer "unacceptable", filling a complaint with FIFA and claiming the €45 million of his release clause. At the beginning of September 2018, Leão wanted to terminate his contract with the club, after his transfer was not approved by the Ligue de Football Professionnel (LFP), due to sanctions imposed by the Direction Nationale du Contrôle de Gestion (DNCG), following Lille's financial difficulties. After being convinced by his representative to stay at Lille, the DNCG validated Lille's pending contracts, including the contract of Leão.

Leão made his competitive debut on 30 September 2018, replacing Loïc Rémy in the 78th minute, in a 3–0 home win over Marseille. He scored his first Ligue 1 goal in only his second appearance, playing 67 minutes and helping the hosts defeat Caen in a 1–0 victory. On 1 February 2019, he scored his sixth goal of the season and made an assist to Nicolas Pépé, his first for the club, in a 4–0 home win over Nice.

During his spell, Leão scored a total of eight goals in 26 competitive games, being mainly used as a striker by Lille coach Christophe Galtier, and shared teams with compatriots José Fonte, Rui Fonte, Edgar Ié and Xeka, as they finished as runners-up in a brilliant 2018–19 Ligue 1 season.

AC Milan

2019–21: Adaptation to Italy
On 1 August 2019, Leão signed a five-year contract at AC Milan for a fee of €35 million plus a 20% sell-on clause. He made his Serie A debut on 25 August, replacing Samu Castillejo in 75th-minute in a 1–0 away defeat to Udinese. Leão scored his first goal of the club, as a late consolation in a 1–3 home loss to Fiorentina on 29 September. On 19 March 2020, the Court of Arbitration for Sport (CAS) condemned Leão to pay €16.5 million to Sporting CP for his unilateral breach of contract. On 7 July 2020, Leão scored a goal against league-leaders Juventus, to help Milan to a 4–2 win, after being down by two goals. At the end of the season, he had scored six goals in 31 league matches, helping Milan to a sixth-place finish and a 10-match unbeaten streak.

At the beginning of the following season, on 4 October 2020, Leão scored a brace in a 3–0 home victory at San Siro against Spezia. On 29 October, he scored his first goal in European competitions, in a 3–0 home group stage victory in the UEFA Europa League against Sparta Prague. He scored the fastest goal in the history of Serie A and in Europe's top-five leagues, after six seconds on 20 December at Sassuolo; the match ended 2–1 for his team.

On 3 January 2021, he scored the second goal against Benevento in eventual 2–0 away win, becoming the second youngest foreign player (21 years and 207 days) to score more than ten goals for Milan in Serie A, after Alexandre Pato (19 years and 19 days).

2021–22: Serie A champion

At the start of the 2021–22 season, on 29 August, Leão scored the first goal from a shot outside the box, in a 4–1 home victory against Cagliari at San Siro. On 15 September, on in his UEFA Champions League debut, he provided an assist for Ante Rebić in a 3–2 away defeat to Liverpool; and on 28 September, he scored his first goal in the competition in a 2–1 home loss against Atlético Madrid.

On 9 February 2022, Leão opened the score sheet against Lazio and assisted the second goal, being directly involved in 14 goals in the season, surpassing his record during his career in Europe's the top 5 leagues. Four days later, in his 100th appearance for Milan, he scored the only goal in 1–0 win against Sampdoria, which put Milan in the top of the league table. On 25 February, he scored his eighth league goal of the season against Udinese, in a eventual 1–1 draw, becoming in the process the second player to score in each of the seven days of a week in Serie A with AC Milan, after Andriy Shevchenko.

On 1 May, Leão scored the winner in a 1–0 win against Fiorentina, becoming the youngest Portuguese to score at least 10 goals in a single Serie A campaign. Seven days later, Leão's two assists to Sandro Tonali helped his team come from behind to defeat Hellas Verona 3–1 away from home, allowing his side to overtake rivals Inter at the top of the Serie A table. On 22 May, he provided a hat-trick of assists for the first time in his career as Milan beat Sassuolo 3–0 away from home to win their first Serie A title in eleven years. At the end of the season, Leão was awarded the Serie A MVP award for the 2021–22 season, finishing the campaign with 11 goals and 10 assists. Leão also established himself as one of the best dribblers (186) in Serie A and the 3rd best among European players after Vinícius Júnior (210) and Allan Saint-Maximin (205).

2022–23
Leão started the season by scoring and providing an assist in a 2–0 home win against Bologna on 27 August. On 3 September, on his 100th appearance in Serie A, he scored a brace and provided an assist to Olivier Giroud in a 3–2 win against crosstown rivals Inter in the Derby della Madonnina; his second goal won him the Serie A Goal of the Month award for September. On 10 September, Leão was sent off for the first time in his club career, after being booked twice, for violent conduct (kicking the head of Alex Ferrari, while attempting to perform an acrobatic bicycle kick) early in the second half of Milan's 2–1 win over Sampdoria. During this time, in October, Leão was one of the 30 candidates who was nominated for the 2022 Ballon d'Or, being placed 14th place in the voting polls, the highest Portuguese player ranked in the voting list. Later that month, Leão was named Serie A Player of the Month.

International career

Youth
With the Portugal under-17s, Leão participated in the 2016 UEFA European Under-17 Championship. In this competition, he played five out of six matches, not playing against the Netherlands in the semifinals. In the finals against Spain, Leão replaced Domingos Quina in the 79th minute; Portugal went on to win the competition for the sixth time, following a 5–4 penalty shoot-out victory after a 1–1 draw in extra-time.

With the under-19s, Leão participated in the 2017 UEFA European Under-19 Championship, helping finishing as runner-up, after losing in the final to England. At the 2019 FIFA U-20 World Cup in Poland he played all three games and scored the only goal in a 1–1 draw against South Africa, though his side did not advance from the group.

On 10 November 2017, aged only 18, Leão won his first cap for the Portugal under-21 side, playing 31 minutes in a 1–1 away draw against Romania for the 2019 UEFA European Championship qualifiers. He scored his first goal at that level on 10 September 2019, in a 2–0 victory in Belarus for the 2021 European Championship qualification campaign. In March 2021, Leão took part in the 2021 UEFA European Under-21 Championship, helping Portugal finish as runners-up, after losing in the final 1–0 to Germany.

Senior

On 5 October 2021, Leão was called up to the senior team for the first time, as a replacement for the injured Rafa Silva. Four days later, he made his international debut, replacing Cristiano Ronaldo at half-time and providing the assist for André Silva's goal in a 3–0 friendly defeat of Qatar.

In October 2022, he was named in Portugal's preliminary 55-man squad for the 2022 FIFA World Cup in Qatar, being included in the final 26-man squad for the tournament. On 25 November, Leão scored his first international goal, closing Portugal's 3–2 group stage win against Ghana. Leão followed with a second World Cup goal on 6 December when he closed Portugal's 6–1 thrashing of Switzerland in the round of 16. Portugal were eliminated in the quarter-finals after losing 1–0 to Morocco, who became the first CAF nation ever to reach the World Cup semi-finals.

Player profile

Style of play
Leão is regarded as a skillful and technical player, capable of playing on either flank, due to his versatility. Tall and lean, Leão has a burst and speed to match, making him a dynamic forward. Having developed as a centre-forward at youth level, he offers a dynamic presence in the forward line. He stretches and disrupts defences with his movements, with and without the ball. Leão is a prolific and proficient dribbler; he drives from deep and then overtakes players in one-on-one situations around the box with maneuvers and changes to his speed. He is also capable of creating chances and providing assists for teammates from the left due to his vision. Inside the penalty area, he uses dribbles and movement to get into good positions. Leão has also been played as a striker because of his composure and eye for goal. During his managerial spell at Milan, Stefano Pioli deployed Leão as a supporting striker or a winger on either side of the pitch, rather than an out-and-out striker.

Reception 
Leão drew comparisons to French player Kylian Mbappé, being called the 'Portuguese Mbappe'. Tiago Fernandes, who worked with him at the Sporting youth academy, told French newspaper L'Équipe that in his opinion the player was better than Cristiano Ronaldo at the same stage. Jesus, who later coached him in the first team, said that he reminded him of former club striker Rui Jordão. Leão's coach at Milan, Stefano Pioli and Italian manager Fabio Capello, compared him to former Arsenal striker Thierry Henry.

Career statistics

Club

International

 Scores and results list Portugal's goal tally first, score column indicates score after each Leão goal.

Honours
AC Milan
Serie A: 2021–22

Portugal
UEFA European Under-17 Championship: 2016
UEFA European Under-19 Championship runner-up: 2017
UEFA European Under-21 Championship runner-up: 2021

Individual
 Serie A Most Valuable Player: 2021–22
 Serie A Player of the Month: October 2022
 Serie A Goal of the Month: September 2022
Serie A Team of the Year: 2021–22
Serie A Footballer of the Year: 2021–22

Records
 Fastest goal ever scored in the Italian Serie A: 6.2 seconds after the start of Sassuolo-AC Milan, in the 2020–21 season.

References

External links

Profile at the AC Milan website

Portuguese League profile 

1999 births
Living people
Sportspeople from Almada
Portuguese sportspeople of Angolan descent
Black Portuguese sportspeople
Portuguese footballers
Association football wingers
Association football forwards
Primeira Liga players
Liga Portugal 2 players
Sporting CP B players
Sporting CP footballers
Ligue 1 players
Lille OSC players
Serie A players
A.C. Milan players
2022 FIFA World Cup players
Portugal youth international footballers
Portugal under-21 international footballers
Portugal international footballers
Portuguese expatriate footballers
Expatriate footballers in France
Expatriate footballers in Italy
Portuguese expatriate sportspeople in France
Portuguese expatriate sportspeople in Italy